The Clara Haskil Piano Competition (French: Concours international de piano Clara Haskil) was founded in 1963 in order to honour and perpetuate the memory the Romanian-Swiss pianist Clara Haskil.

The competition is a member of the World Federation of International Music Competitions since 1976. It takes place every two years in Vevey where Clara Haskil resided from 1942 until her death in Brussels in 1960. A street in Vevey bears her name.

The competition welcomes young pianists from all over the world.

The competition benefits from the collaboration with Radio Suisse Romande Espace 2, and from the generous sponsorship of the Fondation Nestle pour l'Art, Leenards Foundation, Loterie Romande, Stanley Thomas Johnson Foundation, Lombard Odier Darier Hentsch & Cie Bank, the towns and communities of Vevey, Montreux, La Tour-de-Peilz,  Blonay, Chardonne, Corseaux, Corsier, Jongny, and several commercial companies. The members of a circle of private donors, founded in 1999, also support the activities of the Clara Haskil Competition.

The final, broadcast by Radio Suisse Romande Espace 2 and by Télévision Suisse Romande, is part of the Montreux-Vevey International Festival of Opera and Music.

Winners 1963–2019

References

External links 
 

Piano competitions
1963 establishments in Switzerland
Recurring events established in 1963
Music festivals established in 1963